St. Nicholas's Church is the centerpiece of the Lviv Museum of Folk Architecture and Culture, better known as Shevchenkivskyi Hay. It is also part of the Lavra of Saint John of the Ukrainian Studite Monks. This traditional tripartite timber church, encircled by a wooden fence, was transferred in 1930 to Lviv from Kryvka village, now in Sambir Raion, Lviv Oblast. It was originally built by Boiko carpenters in 1763. During the First World War the church was damaged by a shell that pierced the upper gallery.

See also 
 Wooden Churches of Ukraine
 Carpathian Wooden Churches
 Wooden Churches of Southern Little Poland
 Vernacular architecture of the Carpathians
 St. George's Church, Drohobych

References 

 Памятники градостроительства и архитектуры Украинской ССР. Киев: Будивельник, 1983–1986. Том 3, с. 84.

Wooden churches in Ukraine
Churches completed in 1763
Former churches in Ukraine
Churches in Lviv
Relocated buildings and structures
Boykos